Mahauiella is a genus of parasitic flies in the family Tachinidae. There are at least two described species in Mahauiella.

Species
These two species belong to the genus Mahauiella:
 Mahauiella nayrae Toma, 2003
 Mahauiella sforcini Toma, 2003

References

Further reading

 
 
 
 

Tachinidae
Articles created by Qbugbot